Haliotis speciosa is a species of sea snail, a marine gastropod mollusc in the family Haliotidae, the abalones.

Haliotis speciosa has also been considered to be a synonym of  Haliotis alfredensis Bartsch, 1915 and vice versa.

Description
The size of the shell varies between 50 mm and 80 mm.
"The oblong-ovate shell is flatly convex, depressed in the middle, spirally elevately striated. The striae are close-set. The six perforations are open. Its color pattern is scarlet red, beautifully variegated with black-edged white. This is a very pretty species, the color being a rich scarlet red, variegated with broad zigzag flames, edged along the front with black."

Distribution
This marine species occurs from the East Cape  to Northern Transkei, South Afrika.

References

 Reeve, Conch. Icon., f. 47.
 Weinkauff, Conchyl. Cab., p. 49, t. 18, f. 7, 8.

External links
 To Biodiversity Heritage Library (8 publications)
 

speciosa
Molluscs of the Indian Ocean
Fauna of South Africa
Gastropods described in 1846
Taxa named by Lovell Augustus Reeve